Alternative for Sweden (AfS) is a far-right political party in Sweden. It was founded in March 2018 by Gustav Kasselstrand and William Hahne, along with other members of the Sweden Democratic Youth, who were collectively expelled from the Sweden Democrats in 2015. It advocates the forced repatriation of one million immigrants and Sweden's withdrawal from the European Union.

AfS ran in the general elections of 2018 and 2022, but failed to enter the Riksdag. With 0.26% of the vote, AfS is the second largest party without representation in the Riksdag. In the 2019 European Parliament election in Sweden the party ran on an anti-EU platform, receiving 0.46% of the vote. In November 2020 AfS announced their intention to run in the 2021 election to the Church of Sweden council. They won 1.26% of the votes giving them 3 seats in the Church council.

History

*Background 
In early April 2015, the Sweden Democrats (SD) accused its youth league, the Sweden Democrat Youth (SDU), of having relations with the far-right and ethnonationalist organization Nordic Youth which had been founded by members of the National Democrats, an ethnopluralist breakaway group from the SD. The SDU had also encountered repeated controversies of its members being accused of making racist statements. In response to these alleged relations, SD threatened to expel several leading members of SDU unless the league moderated itself. SDU's leader Gustav Kasselstrand, and its deputy leader William Hahne, were eventually expelled from the party on 27 April 2015. They both denied the accusations of relations with extremist groups, and claimed that SD's parliamentary group leader Mattias Karlsson wanted to get rid of them after Hahne defeated the leadership's preferred candidate for the chairmanship of SDU in Stockholm.

Following the initial expulsion of the youth wing's chairman and deputy chairman, the mother party launched its own leadership candidate to compete against Jessica Ohlson, who was considered an ally of Kasselstrand and Hahne and deemed too radical by the SD for a leadership position. The SD warned that the party would break all ties with SDU if Ohlson were to be elected chairman. On September 12, 2015, Ohlson defeated the party's preferred candidate for the SDU chairmanship, and the party shut down SDU's website and broke all relations with its youth wing. It then established a new youth organization, Ungsvenskarna (Young Swedes) and produced a timetable that every SD member who remained a member of SDU should leave the league or risk expulsion from the mother party. Ohlson herself was officially expelled alongside five other SDU members on October 25, but continued to serve as chairman of SDU, which went on to become an independent organization.

Founding and defections 
In early 2017, Sveriges Radio reported that SDU members had filed a party registration application to the election authority. The party was eventually registered on December 13, 2017, with Kasselstrand, Hahne and Ohlson in central positions. It was then officially launched on March 5, 2018; at the same time, it announced that it would participate in the 2018 elections. At the time of the launch, the party was described as drawing inspiration from Alternative for Germany, the Freedom Party of Austria and the French National Rally.

Two Sweden Democrat members of the Riksdag, Olle Felten and Jeff Ahl, defected to the party later that month. According to the rules of the Riksdag, Felten and Ahl are considered independent MP's, meaning that Alternative for Sweden is not officially represented in the parliament. Mikael Jansson, former leader of the Sweden Democrats, also defected on April 9, citing the mother party's recent lack of resistance to NATO as his main reason.

Before the 2018 elections the party was one of the largest in terms of social media interactions and expected to enter the parliament after the elections, with leader Gustav Kasselstrand asking people on Twitter to prepare for "Sweden's biggest political earthquake in modern times". However, the party failed to enter parliament by a large margin, receiving just 0.31 out of the 4.0 percent needed to get past the election threshold. On election night, the party was reported to have been kicked out of the Persian restaurant it had rented to celebrate the election results. According to high-level officials at Facebook, AfS social media interactions were reviewed just before the 2018 election. Accused of using bots to manipulate the algorithm and inflate the party's perceived popularity, actions were taken by Facebook to limit certain activities of AfS accounts just before the election.  It did not participate in the municipal elections.

Since 2018 
After the 2018 election, the party participated in the 2019 election for the European Parliament, but failed to gain a seat.

In March 2020, the party's deputy chairman and founding member William Hahne resigned from his position, after he had been revealed by Expressen to run a webshop selling surgical masks for a price 759% higher than other commercial sellers of surgical masks during the COVID-19 pandemic.

Ideology and policies 

On its website, Alternative for Sweden lists three key issues:
 Repatriation of immigrants
 Democracy and politicians
 Law and order
It is critical of the current political establishment which it accuses of being naive and overly politically correct. Alternative for Sweden accuses "the Left" of hijacking societal institutions to rewrite history.

Unlike the Sweden Democrats, Alternative for Sweden is non-interventionist and displays hard Euroscepticism which it considers the European Union a threat to Sweden's independence and seek to call for the country to leave the EU. It also seeks to rearm the military and form a Nordic defense alliance, instead of making Sweden dependent on NATO. It wishes to restrict welfare benefits to Swedish citizens, shift from progressive to flat income tax, replace the differentiated VAT rates with a fixed rate, re-nationalise all schools, and combat the idea of a cashless society. AfS also wishes to make the country self-sufficient and end the use of fossil fuels, citing both environmental protection and national security reasons.

AfS has been described as right-wing, far-right and right-wing populist by Svenska Dagbladet, while Dagens Nyheter has described the party as nationalist and right-wing populist. Bloomberg News has described the party as social conservative and far-right. The ideology of the party has also been described as close to the identitarian and alt-right movements. During the 2019 European Parliament election party leader Kasselstrand was endorsed by the far-right European party Alliance for Peace and Freedom (APF) on Facebook.

Economic policies 

Alternative for Sweden have stated in its program that the party wants to introduce flat tax and uniform VAT.

Foreign policies

Foreign relations 

During a visit to Moscow in 2018, party leader Gustav Kasselstrand attended a conference to establish connections with other nationalist parties in Europe. That same year, Mikael Jansson met with close contacts to president Bashar al-Assad during a visit to Syria.

In July 2022, several representatives from Alternative for Sweden, including Anders Feymark, travelled to Hungary to meet officials from the Hungarian party Our Homeland Movement, a party described as a "sister party" to Alternative for Sweden. Representatives from Alternative for Germany and Forum for Democracy were also present. Our Homeland Movement party leader László Toroczkai, as well as Alternative for Germany's Stefan Korte, both held individual speeches at Alternative for Sweden's election campaign meeting held in Rålambshovsparken in Stockholm on 6 August 2022.

Social policies

Immigration 

In March 2018, Jeff Ahl gave a speech in the Riksdag, stating that hundreds of thousands of people would be deported out of Sweden if Alternative for Sweden gained power.

LGBT issues 

Alternative for Sweden is supportive of a ban on same-sex adoption as well as same-sex marriage. The party has described same-sex marriage as a "modern construction intended to commit violence against multi-thousand-year-old traditions". Alternative for Sweden has accused Stockholm Pride of sexualizing minors.

Party Board

Leaders

Deputy Leaders

Secretaries

Treasurers

Public Meetings

Candidates

2018 Election 

The party ran for election for the Riksdag with 50 candidates.

Riksdag

2019 Election 

The party ran for election for the Federal Parliament with 10 candidates.

Federal Parliament

2021 Election 

The party ran for election in 4 Diocese Councils with 33 candidates and the National Council with 66 candidates.

National Council

Diocese Councils

2022 Election 

The party ran for election in 4 County Councils with 82 candidates and 53 Municipal Councils with 128 candidates as well as the Riksdag with 44 candidates.

Riksdag

County Councils

Municipal Councils

Election results

Riksdag

European Parliament

Church of Sweden Council

References

External links 

 

Swedish nationalism
Conservative parties in Sweden
Anti-Islam political parties in Europe
Criticism of Islam
Political parties established in 2017
2017 establishments in Sweden
Eurosceptic parties in Sweden
Nationalist parties in Sweden
Social conservative parties
Far-right politics in Sweden
Right-wing populism in Sweden
Right-wing populist parties
Minor political parties in Sweden
Anti-Islam sentiment in Sweden
Anti-immigration politics in Europe
Alternative for Germany spinoff
Alt-right organizations